State Route 104 (SR 104) is a west–east state highway in the U.S. state of California that runs from the Central Valley to the Sierra Foothills. It connects State Route 99 near Galt to State Route 49 in Sutter Creek via the city of Ione. It is known as Twin Cities Road from its western terminus up until just before Ione. West of the SR 104/SR 99 interchange, Twin Cities Road continues to Interstate 5 and then eventually end at State Route 160 north of Walnut Grove.

Route description
The route begins in Galt in Sacramento County at SR 99. It then heads eastward, forming the northern boundary of the city of Galt. The route turns northeast, passing through Herald, near Rancho Seco Nuclear Generating Station and on to the community of Clay before entering Amador County. It then continues past Mule Creek State Prison and begins a short overlap with SR 124 in Ione. Afterwards, it exits the town and has another overlap with SR 88, where it goes through the community of Sunnybrook. Its eastern terminus is at SR 49 in Sutter Creek.

SR 104 is not part of the National Highway System, a network of highways that are considered essential to the country's economy, defense, and mobility by the Federal Highway Administration.

History 
The route formerly extended to West Point, but the segment between SR 88 and West Point was transferred to SR 26 in 1984. According to the California Streets and Highways code, SR 104 is an unfinished route as the highway's legislative designation extends past SR 49 east to SR 88. Ridge Road makes this exact connection, but it is not currently owned or maintained by Caltrans.

Major intersections

See also

References

External links

California @ AARoads.com - State Route 104
Caltrans: Route 104 highway conditions
California Highways: SR 104

104
State Route 104
State Route 104